Montague Waldegrave, 5th Baron Radstock (15 July 1867 – 17 September 1953) was the second son of Granville Waldegrave, 3rd Baron Radstock and his wife, Susan Charlotte Calcroft.

Early life and education
Radstock was educated at Monkton Combe School and Trinity College, Cambridge, graduating with a BA degree in 1889. 

When his elder brother the 4th baron died without issue in 1937, he succeeded to the title of Baron Radstock of Castle Town, Queen's County, Ireland.

Marriage and children
Radstock married Constance Marion Brodie on 15 July 1898. They had three daughters and a son:

 Rachel Elizabeth Waldegrave (born 12 May 1899, died 6 January 1900)
 Hon Esther Constance Waldegrave (born 11 November 1900, died 17 April 1957)
 Hon Elizabeth Alexandra Sophia Waldegrave (born 22 September 1902)
 Commander Hon John Montagu Granville Waldegrave DSC RN (born 29 August 1905, killed in action 18 February 1944)

Radstock's only son, John, was killed in action in 1944 whilst on active service aboard , leaving behind two daughters. With no remaining male heirs, the barony became extinct on the death of the 5th baron at the age of 86 in 1953.

Arms

References

thepeerage.com

1867 births
1953 deaths
Barons in the Peerage of Ireland
Waldegrave family
Alumni of Trinity College, Cambridge
People educated at Monkton Combe School